Maria Chabot (1913–2001), was an advocate for Native American arts, a rancher, and a friend of Georgia O'Keeffe. She led the restoration of her house in Abiquiú, New Mexico and took the photograph of O'Keeffe entitled Women Who Rode Away, in which the artist was on the back of a motorcycle driven by Maurice Grosser. Their correspondence was published in the book Maria Chabot—Georgia O'Keeffe: Correspondence 1941-1949.

Chabot has documented and promoted Spanish colonial and Native American art in the Southwest and facilitated the development of the Santa Fe Indian Market from small fairs throughout the state. She was executive secretary of the New Mexico Association on Indian Affairs. Chabot has been described as "a photographer, writer, and explorer".

Early life 
Maria Lea Chabot was born on September 19, 1913 in San Antonio, Texas, the daughter of Charles Jasper Chabot, a capitalist, and his third wife Olive Anderston Johnston, Chabot. Maria Chabot had three half-sibblings who reached adulthood from her parent's previous marriages: Frederick Charles Chabot, Edith Lilian Chabot, and James Kennedy Johnston.

Chabot developed an interest in writing and painting in her teens. After graduating from high school, Chabot took a job as copywriter at a San Antonio department store and also wrote short stories. She continued to write fiction into the 1960s, but the short stories and novels were never published.

Chabot moved to Santa Fe about 1931, when she was 18. She traveled in 1933 to Mexico City to pursue her interests in literature and art and visit a relative, Emily Edwards, who lived there at the time. She met sisters Dorothy Stewart and Margretta Stewart Dietrich, Olive Rush, Erna Fergusson, as well as José Clemente Orozco, Diego Rivera, and other notable Mexican artists. Stewart became an integral part of her life, professionally and romantically, in the 1930s.

Dorothy Stewart 
After Chabot and Stewart met, they began a romantic relationship. Stewart had asked Chabot to assist her with a fresco for a theatre in Albuquerque. They lived together in Santa Fe and traveled extensively during the 1930s. They visited Europe, Africa, and the Americas. Through Stewart, Chabot met many influential, progressive people, like freind and benefactor Mary Cabot Wheelwright, archaeologist Jesse L. Nusbaum, and Native American pottery expert Kenneth M. Chapman. Grace Guest, assistant curator of Freer Gallery of Art in Washington, D.C., became her friend. The romantic relationship with Stewart ended in 1939. The women remained close friends until Stewart's death in 1955.

Career

Advocate for Native Americans 
In 1934, she went with Stewart to Santa Fe, New Mexico and she was employed by the New Mexico Department of Vocational Education. She worked at the federal Indian Arts and Crafts Board in 1935. With these agencies and as part of a Works Progress Administration (WPA) initiative, she photographed and documented Spanish Colonial and Native American arts and crafts in the Southwest and territorial architecture in New Mexico. To complete the photographic survey, she traveled throughout the Southwestern United States with Stewart in the 1930s and 1940s. She photographed the collection of Mary Cabot Wheelwright, who was a noted collector of Navajo art, now in the Wheelwright Museum of the American Indian. In the 1930s, Chabot published articles on Native American arts and crafts, for New Mexico Magazine to inform potential buyers on how to identify valuable works of art. 

Chabot was made the executive secretary of the New Mexico Association on Indian Affairs in 1936. During that time, she came up with the idea for the Santa Fe Indian Market like the outdoor markets in Mexico. Held at the Palace of the Governors, the market held weekly fairs and rented schools buses to transport Native Americans to the markets where they could sell their jewelry, pottery, or other wares. Initially, local businesses opposed the Native American markets, which were established by Chabot to promote their works. She visited pueblos and encouraged artists to sell their works, including Maria Martinez, a potter of the San Ildefonso Pueblo. She worked then at the federal Indian Arts and Crafts Board where she established cooperative marketing organizations on reservations.

Rancher 
Chabot lived at Mary Cabot Wheelwright's Los Luceros property in Alcalde, New Mexico after then end of her relationship with Dorothy Stewart. She was a companion and ran Wheelwright's cattle ranch, farm, and fruit tree orchard for 20 years. She worked in the fields with the men. During that period, she was president of the local irrigation association. Wheelwright died in 1958 and the Los Luceros was deeded to Chabot. It was onerous for Chabot to manage the property and she sold it to Charles and Nina Collier in the early 1960s.

Georgia O'Keeffe 
In 1940, Chabot met O'Keeffe, with whom she had a friendship that allowed for Chabot to write in a peaceful setting and for O'Keefe to paint and spend part of the year in New York with her husband Alfred Stieglitz. Chabot spent the summers and falls at her house on the Ghost Ranch from 1941 to 1944, managing the ranch in the summers. During the winter and spring, Chabot returned to San Antonio. She camped with O'Keeffe in northern New Mexico and was captured in the painting Maria goes to a Party in one of O'Keeffe's paintings of their trips.

Beginning in 1945, Chabot led the restoration of an adobe hacienda (Georgia O'Keeffe Home and Studio) in Abiquiú for O'Keeffe, who oversaw the restoration. Chabot said of the experience, "I had never found anything as romantic as this beat-up building, a ruin really... It took six months just to get the pigs out of the house." 

Chabot and O'Keeffe had exchanged almost 700 letters until 1986 when O'Keeffe died. In her later years, Chabot assembled her correspondence with O'Keeffe and photographs to illustrate a book, but did not complete the book in her lifetime. When she died, the materials were transferred to the Georgia O'Keeffe Museum Research Center. The book Maria Chabot—Georgia O'Keeffe: Correspondence 1941-1949 was published in 2004.

Later years and death
In 1961, Chabot married radio astronomer Dana K. Bailey who works at the Los Alamos National Laboratory. Married for only six months, she said, "we were much better as friends than as husband and wife." In the 1960s, she sold the ranch that she had inherited from Wheelwright and moved to Albuquerque, where she cared for her mother.

She was named a "Living Treasure" of Santa Fe in 1996. Chabot died on July 9, 2001 at 87 years of age in an Albuquerque hospital.

Notes

References

Bibliography
 

1913 births
2001 deaths
People from San Antonio
People from Rio Arriba County, New Mexico
People from Abiquiú, New Mexico
LGBT people from Texas
LGBT people from New Mexico
20th-century American LGBT people